Hoplerythrinus unitaeniatus is a species of trahira (family Erythrinidae). It is a tropical, pelagic freshwater fish.

References

Erythrinidae
Taxa named by Johann Baptist von Spix
Taxa_named_by_Louis_Agassiz
Fish described in 1829